Izone is an industrial suburb of Rolleston in Selwyn District, Canterbury Region, New Zealand.

History
Izone was proposed by Selwyn District Council in August 2000 to attract business to their district. The council bought  of rural land in April 2001 to start the venture. One year later, the council signed up The Warehouse Group to have their South Island distribution centre established on the site. The distribution centre, which opened in June 2003, was built for the council by Naylor Love and later sold it to an investment fund.

By 2010, Izone was New Zealand's biggest industrial subdivision. In 2015, Port of Lyttelton and Port of Tauranga both built container handling facilities at Izone. Port of Lyttelton did so because the Christchurch Southern Motorway had caused congestion on Brougham Street, slowing down access to Canterbury's port. Port of Tauranga did so because it owns a half-share in PrimePort Timaru. Both these South Island ports are accessible via the Main South Line. The PrimePort facility opened in July 2015 and Lyttelton's MidlandPort opened in June 2016.

Location and access
Izone is framed on two sides by railway lines. The Main South Line forms the southern boundary and the Midland Line forms the south-western boundary. Parallel to and just beyond the Main South Line is State Highway 1, and beyond the highway is the township of Rolleston.

The intersection on State Highway 1 that is formed with Hoskyns Road was signalised in March 2007. As State Highway 1 segregates the township from its industrial subdivision, a bridge is planned to connect Rolleston with Izone to be constructed in 2021.

Demographics 

Rolleston Izone had a population of 33 at the 2018 New Zealand census, a decrease of 18 people (-35.3%) since the 2013 census, and a decrease of 30 people (-47.6%) since the 2006 census. There were 6 households. There were 15 males and 18 females, giving a sex ratio of 0.83 males per female. The median age was 35.3 years (compared with 37.4 years nationally), with 3 people (9.1%) aged under 15 years, 12 (36.4%) aged 15 to 29, 15 (45.5%) aged 30 to 64, and 3 (9.1%) aged 65 or older.

Ethnicities were 72.7% European/Pākehā, 27.3% Māori, 9.1% Asian, and 9.1% other ethnicities (totals add to more than 100% since people could identify with multiple ethnicities).

The proportion of people born overseas was 9.1%, compared with 27.1% nationally.

Although some people objected to giving their religion, 63.6% had no religion and 18.2% were Christian.

Of those at least 15 years old, 3 (10.0%) people had a bachelor or higher degree, and 3 (10.0%) people had no formal qualifications. The median income was $32,200, compared with $31,800 nationally. The employment status of those at least 15 was that 21 (70.0%) people were employed full-time and 3 (10.0%) were part-time.

See also 
 Industrial suburb

References

Rolleston, New Zealand